MACET may refer to:

Engineering Colleges in India:
 Marthandam College of Engineering and Technology, in Marthandam 
 Maulana Azad College of Engineering and Technology, in Patna, Bihar
 Maharaja Agrasen College of Engineering and Technology, in J.P. Nagar, Uttar Pradesh